F1000 or variation, may refer to:

 F1000 (publisher), a science publisher, and publisher of services for life scientists and clinical researchers.
 Formula 1000, a 1-L (1000-cc) open-wheel open-cockpit single-seater motorsports car racing category
 Australian Formula 1000
 North American Formula 1000 Championship
 DKW F1000 L, a panel van light commercial vehicle
 Ford F-1000, a pickup truck, part of the Ford F-Series (fifth generation)
 Farman F.1000, an airplane
 HP F1000A, an MS-DOS based palmtop pocket PC
 2019 Chinese Grand Prix of Formula One; the 1000th Grands Prix of the World Driving Championship, with the special logo "F1000"
 2020 Tuscan Grand Prix of Formula One, at Mugello, Italy; the 1000th Grands Prix for Scuderia Ferrari; the F1000 GP

See also
 Ferrari SF1000 (Scuderia Ferrari 1000), the F1 racecar for Ferarri's 1000th Grands Prix and 2020 season
 1000 (disambiguation)
 F100 (disambiguation)
 F10 (disambiguation)
 F1 (disambiguation)
 F (disambiguation)